Ranipur Wildlife Sanctuary,  found in 1977, is one of the attractions of Chitrakoot district in Uttar Pradesh. It is spread over 230 km2 and is noted for its diverse wildlife, but is not very frequently visited by tourists because of the difficult access. In 2022, the Government of Uttar Pradesh notified the area of Ranipur Tiger reserve situated in the Chitrakoot District of Uttar Pradesh with notification No.589/81-4-2022-801-2018 Lucknow, dated 19 October 2022.

Attractions
It is the natural habitat of several animals and birds including tigers, leopards, sloth bears, sambars, blackbucks, peafowl, spur fowl, jungle fowl, painted partridges,kingfisher,sparrow, fishing cats and chinkaras.

External links
http://www.indiatourismonline.com/uttarpradesh-wildlife-ranipursanctuary.htm
http://www.india9.com/i9show/Ranipur-Wildlife-Sanctuary-38331.htm

Wildlife sanctuaries in Uttar Pradesh
Banda district, India
Chitrakoot district
1977 establishments in Uttar Pradesh
Protected areas established in 1977